James Heneghan (7 October 1930 – 23 April 2021) was a British–Canadian author of children's and young adult novels. Heneghan grew up Liverpool, England, and emigrated to Vancouver, British Columbia, in 1957, where he lived until his death on April 23, 2021. He earned Canadian citizenship in 1963.

Bibliography
Goodbye, Carleton High (1983)
Promises to Come (1988)
Blue (1991)
Torn Away (1994) – winner 1995  Arthur Ellis Best Juvenile Crime Award.
Wish Me Luck (1997) – nominated for the 1997 Governor General's Award Young People’s Literature – Text, winner 1998 Sheila A. Egoff Children’s Literature Prize, winner Phoenix Award 2017.

The Grave (2000) – winner 2001  Sheila A. Egoff Children’s Literature Prize.
Flood (2002) – winner 2004 Chocolate Lily Young Readers’ Choice Award, winner 2003 Sheila A. Egoff Children’s Literature Prize.
Hit Squad (2003)
Waiting for Sarah (2003) – winner of the Manitoba Young Readers' Choice Award.
Nannycatch Chronicles (2005)
Safe House (2006)
Payback (2007)
Bank Job (2009)
Fit to Kill (2011)

O'Brien Detective Agency series
The Case of the Marmalade Cat (1991)
The Trail of the Chocolate Thief (1993)
The Mystery of the Gold Ring (1995)
The Case of the Blue Raccoon (1996)

References 

1930 births
2021 deaths
Canadian male novelists
Canadian children's writers
English emigrants to Canada
Writers from Liverpool